Hapoel Haifa Football Club (Moadon HaKaduregel Hapoel Haifa) is an Israeli football club located in the city of Haifa. The club won one championship (1998–99) and 4 Israeli cups (1962–63, 1965–66 and 1973–74, 2017–18). The team is also known as "The Sharks". The club's home is the Sammy Ofer Stadium in Haifa, in which they have played since their departure from Kiryat Eliezer Stadium in 2014 and Kiryat Haim's Thomas D'Alesandro Stadium in 1955. The stadium, which is shared with rivals Maccabi Haifa, is the second largest in Israeli football, with a capacity of 30,858. The colours of the team's home kit are red throughout. The away colours are white shirts, and black shorts and socks.

History

The Early years

The beginning of the club was in a local organization in 1924 was established in Kiryat Haim in the Mutasarrifate of Jerusalem  (present-day Israel). This organization included several branches related to sports, in addition to branches related to worker movements and the Histadrut. Their goal was to found the first ever labor football club in Palestine, like those around the world. The most acceptable version about the club's establishment says that during Passover, on April 24, 1924, the establishment meeting took place, in a house at the Hadar Neighborhood in Haifa, including 36 representatives of the different authorities. The meeting was led by Yehoshua Sherpstein and Yair Aharony.

On May 1, 1924, Labor Day, was the first match, in which Hapoel Haifa beat 3–1 the train workers of Haifa. In the first years of the club it played mainly friendly matches against different teams from Palestine, Europe, and the Middle East (Since the Football Association was yet to be established, there were no formal matches).
At the beginning Hapoel Haifa was included under the Maccabi union, since it was the only union at that time. Two years later the club decided to leave Maccabi, and was among the founders of the new union, Hapoel.

In 1928 the Israel Football Association (IFA) was founded, and formal matches were scheduled: In the first 4 years only cup matches, and afterwards league matches were added. During these years Hapoel Haifa did not win many trophies, yet it was still one of the leading teams in the country. In 1932 the team qualified to its first cup final, against the British Police. The referee was British, and some of the decisions he made were very controversial. During the match, when the score was 1–0 to Hapoel Haifa (goal by Yonah Stern), after some decisions that the players of Haifa found very odd and unfair, one of Haifa players stole the cup. As a result, Hapoel Haifa was disqualified. That year 5 of Haifa's players made it to the Palestine squad.

The Fifties

In 1950, after the 1947–1949 Palestine war, the Israeli League returned to action, and Haifa finished in the 3rd place, after Maccabi and Hapoel Tel Aviv. Two years later the cup matches were renewed. These years were direct continuation to the seasons before the state of Israel was established, when the team was one of the leaders, yet did not manage to win any trophies.

The Sixties and The Seventies

Hapoel Haifa was very weak in the early sixties. The team finished 1962–63 one before last, and was supposed to relegate to the second division. But, due to suspicions about improper matches, the relegations were canceled (many say that this was due to the connections of the heads of Hapoel in the IFA). At this turning point, many talented young players promoted from the youth team, causing a significant improvement that started the club's best period. In the same season, 1962–63, the club won the Israel State Cup, after beating Maccabi Haifa in the final 1–0. In all of the following seasons the team finished in the top third of the league, and qualified to the cup final three more times. The main players of the team at that time were Abba Gindin, Yitzhak Englander, Yochanan Vollach and Roby Young. These players were some of the greatest players in Israeli football in the 1960s and the 1970s and were part of the Israel national team for many years. Roby Young was even the captain of the national team.

In 1974 Hapoel Haifa won the Israeli cup again. In those years the club's leading players began to leave it, including the shocking transfer of Englander and Vollach to the bitter rival Maccabi Haifa, due to Hapoel's poor management. Although the team finished 2nd in 1975, a great fall began, leading to the big crush of the 1980s.

The-eighties: The Downfall

In 1981 the team relegated, for the first time ever, to the second division. Until then it was one of the 3 clubs that never relegated (alongside Maccabi and Hapoel Tel Aviv). That was the beginning of the worst decade in the club's history. Even the signing of Peter Lorimer, one of the greatest players of Leeds United, as manager, didn't help and he left several months later. The big crisis in the Histadrut led to a financial crisis in the club, which was on the verge of bankruptcy. The crisis hit also the administrative side, and directors were replaced frequently. Near the end of the 1980s, three former players of the club, Yitzhak Englander, Avi Kaufman and Efraim Gabay, took the club to their hands as an exterior organization, hoping to save the club from bankruptcy, yet due to lack of funding sources they couldn't solve the financial crisis in the club.

The Nineties: The Age of Shapira

In 1992 the team promoted to the first division in the second time. That season was accompanied with rumors about an anonymous businessman who took responsibility on the club. Ultimately, the anonymous was turned out to be Robi Shapira, a businessman who made his fortune in the fishing business in Nigeria. Shapira gave big amounts of money to the club and saved it from financial collapse. That money was used to purchase many leading players, but the team made no remarkable achievement and was still at relegating danger. Following a long streak of losses during the season of 1993–94 Shapira decided to buy the club from the Histadrut. In the first years under Shapira many great players and managers were brought to the team, yet it could not win trophies and achieve the club's great ambition: championship.

1998–99: The Championship

In 1997–98 Hapoel Haifa reached 3rd place, with Eli Guttman as manager. The following season the team was tagged as a top team, but not as a candidate for championship. In spite of the predictions, a streak of impressive victories put Haifa in the 1st place, with a big advantage over the rest of the league. Hapoel Haifa showed a very tactical and effective style of football that dragged criticism from different sources, such as the media and other teams. Hapoel Haifa remained in the 1st place and increased its advantage over other teams.

On Saturday, May 8, 1999, in the 27th round of the league, Hapoel Haifa competed with Maccabi Tel Aviv, who was 2nd before that round, in Kiryat Eliezer Stadium. Hapoel Haifa won the match 3–2 (two goals by Oren Zeituni and one more by Oren Nissim) and was crowned as champion, for the first (and only) time.

Millennium – Present: The Death of Shapira and Inconsistent Results
In the season following the championship, the team finished a disappointing 7th. Two key players left (Liron Basis to Maccabi Tel Aviv, Najwan Ghrayib to Aston Villa), and their replacements couldn't lead the team to repeat the great achievement. The next season, the manager Guttman left, and his replacement Guy Levy brought 4 new foreign players: Alin Minteuan, Oleg Yelshev, Michael Anicic and Viktor Paço, who joined veteran Dimitry Ulianov. The team finished in the 3rd place after two victories in the Haifa derby against Maccabi (3–0 and 3–1), and 3 victories over the current champion Hapoel Tel Aviv (3–1 and 1–0 in Tel Aviv and 2–0 at home).

In the summer of 2001, the media reported that Shapira had decided to reduce his investment in the club significantly. The club's budget was decreased, planned expenditures were canceled and key players were released. It was later discovered that Shapira's financial status had deteriorated. He had significant debts and his businesses were close to bankruptcy. Some of the club's assets, including player cards, were mortgaged to a Dutch fishing company which Shapira owed money to. On Friday, December 14, 2001, Shapira committed suicide in his house in Nigeria. After his suicide, the court in Haifa ruled that Hapoel Haifa would be administered by a temporary liquidators. At the end of that season (2001–02), Hapoel Haifa was relegated to the second division. For nearly 3 years the club was managed by 3 liquidators, who managed to keep the team in the second division and simultaneously looking for potential purchasers to the club.

Following its return to the top division in 2004, the club was bought by Yoav Katz, an Israeli businessman who resides in the United States. Hapoel Haifa played a single season (2004–05) in Israel's top league before again being relegated to the second division, where it stayed until the end of the 2008–09 season. After finishing first in the second division that year, Hapoel Haifa returned to the Israeli Premier league, and finished high enough in the standings to avoid relegation at the end of 2010. Nitzan Shirazi replaced Shlomi Dora as manager prior to the 2010–11 season. The club remains very well known and respected in the local league, though no silverware is added to the trophy cabinet. Many foreign players who choose to sign for the club are later on successful in the higher ranks and leagues, due to the club's good connections, and the club is up until current days a good place for players to grow and promote from.

In 2005–06 the club's youth team won the youth league's championship, and established dominance as one of the best teams in Israel's youth league.

European Appearances

Hapoel Haifa was the first Israeli team to qualify to the third qualifying round of the UEFA Champions League (2000). The team passed Beşiktaş (Turkey) in the second qualifying round after 1–1 in Turkey (Đovani Roso scored to Haifa) and 0–0 in Kiryat Eliezer in the second leg. In the third qualifying round the team lost twice 2–0 to Valencia (Spain), who went on till the Champions League Final that year.

After losing to Valencia Hapoel Haifa met Club Brugge from Belgium in the UEFA Cup. Hapoel Haifa won that match 3–1 (two goals by Amir Turgeman and one by Nir Sevillia). In the second leg in Belgium Hapoel Haifa gained a quick advantage (Roso). Brugge managed to turn the score to 3–1; Amir Turgeman scored the 3–2 in the 75' minute and Brugge scored in stoppage time to win 4–2. Yet it was Haifa who qualified to the next level, due to advantage in away goals. It was the first time an Israeli team qualifies to the second round of the UEFA cup.

In the second round Haifa met Ajax from the Netherlands. In the first leg in Israel Ajax won 3–0. In the second leg Hapoel Haifa made a sensational victory of 1–0, with Đovani Roso scoring a penalty kick and missing another.

Matches

Stadium

Hapoel Haifa originally played in Kiryat Haim, which is the main training grounds of this club. In 1955, a gift from the Italian Labour Union was a football pitch in the heart of the city of Haifa, which would become the new home of Hapoel. The opening match was a Haifa derby, lost by Hapoel 4–1 over Maccabi.

New stadium

After the municipality of Haifa offered the club land for a stadium at the southern entrance to the city, Sammy Ofer Stadium was built, and now serves as Hapoel's home stadium, holding 30,858 seats.

City Rivalry with Maccabi Haifa

The two main clubs in Haifa, Hapoel Haifa and Maccabi Haifa, has a long history of raging rivalry that includes mutually loathing and fan conflicts, a rivalry that went on even during Hapoel Haifa's less successful years in second division. The source of this rivalry is mainly in the clubs' political identity.
Hapoel was founded as a socialist labor team, who were identified mainly with the Histadrut and the reign of Mapai, both local and national. Hapoel was identified as the team of the establishment that was supported by the authorities. Therefore, naturally, Maccabi Haifa became the deprived team, that theoretically has to fight for its existence. The differences between the clubs created the differences between the fans: Hapoel Haifa's fans were traditionally identified with the political left side of the map, most of the workers in the industries in Haifa. The Maccabi Haifa fans were identified mostly as part of the medium-low status.

In the last years the differences between the two sides faded, mainly because Maccabi's numerous achievements, which enlarged and varied their fan group. Yet there is still a slight difference between the two fan groups. Many of the fans of Hapoel are living in the Krayot. In the last years the rivalry got a more sportive shade, which appears especially before derby matches.

In popular culture
The main characters in Eran Riklis's 1999 film Vulcan Junction are Hapoel Haifa's supporters and one of the characters is a club's player. The club management collaborated with the production and some of the scenes shot in the club's stadium in Kiryat Haim, some of the club's personnel even took part in the filming as extras. Hapoel Haifa supporter character also presented in the 2002 feature Broken Wings, directed by the club supporter, Nir Bergman. Literatural references of the club are available in the Hebrew books:  (by Amir Gutfreund, available in English), Go To Gaza (by Shay Lahav), Tashlich (by Nir Kipnis) and the football short stories anthology The Dutchman of Acre.

Shirt Sponsors and manufacturers

Season to season

Current squad
 As of January 2023.

Foreigners 2022–23
Only up to six non-Israeli nationals can be in an Israeli club squad. Those with Jewish ancestry, married to an Israeli, or have played in Israel for an extended period of time, can claim a passport or permanent residency which would allow them to play with Israeli status.

  Denis Polyakov
  Constantinos Soteriou
  Mohammed Kamara
  Arvydas Novikovas
  Aleksandar Šćekić
  Carnejy Antoine

Titles

League

Cup competitions

Coaching staff

Coaches
 Mordechai Spiegler (1979–80)
 Yehoshua Feigenbaum (1983–84)
 Dror Kashtan (July 1, 1994 – June 30, 1995)
 Avram Grant (July 1, 1995 – June 30, 1996)
 Eli Guttman (1997–00)
 Guy Levy (2000–02)
 Eli Guttman (2002)
 Yehoshua Feigenbaum (2002–03)
 Baruch Maman (2003–04)
 Nir Levine (2004–05)
 Ran Ben Shimon (2005–06)
 Rafi Cohen (June 2006 – Sept 06)
 Shlomi Dora (Jan 28, 2007 – May 25, 2010)
 Nitzan Shirazi (June 5, 2010 – Nov 26, 2011)
 Tal Banin (Nov 27, 2011 – May 13, 2012)
 Nir Klinger (July 1, 2012 – June 30, 2013)
 Shlomi Dora (July 1, 2013 – May 14, 2014)
 Reuven Atar (July 1, 2014 – Feb 16, 2015)
 Tal Banin (Feb 16, 2015 – Dec 15)
 Meir Ben Margi (Dec 2015 – February 15, 2016)
 Eli Cohen (February 15, 2016 – Dec 16)
 Dani Golan (December 2016– March 2017)
 Nir Klinger (March 2017– October 2018)
 Sharon Mimer (November 2018 – April 2019)
 Haim Silvas (April 2019 - April 2021)
 Elisha Levi (April 2021 - May 2022)
 Nir Klinger (June 1, 2022 – October 23, 2022)
 Ronny Levy (October 25, 2022 – ?)

References

External links

 Hapoel Haifa – The Official Site
 red – the official fans site
 Hapoel Haifa F.C. Twitter – the official Twitter

 
Hapoel Haifa
Haifa
Football clubs in Haifa
Haifa
1924 establishments in Mandatory Palestine
Association football clubs established in 1924